The 2011–12 ISU World Standings and Season's World Ranking, are the World Standings and Season's World Ranking published by the International Skating Union (ISU) during the 2011–12 season.

The 2011–12 ISU World Standings for single & pair skating and ice dance, are taking into account results of the 2009–10, 2010–11 and 2011–12 seasons.

The 2011–12 ISU Season's World Ranking is based on the results of the 2011–12 season only.

The 2011–12 ISU World standings for synchronized skating, are based on the results of the 2009–10, 2010–11 and 2011–12 seasons.

World Standings for single & pair skating and ice dance

Season-end standings 
The remainder of this section is a complete list, by discipline, published by the ISU.

Men's singles (181 skaters)

Ladies' singles (209 skaters)

Pairs (93 couples)

Ice dance (130 couples)

Season's World Ranking 
The remainder of this section is a complete list, by discipline, published by the ISU.

Men's singles (124 skaters)

Ladies' singles (126 skaters)

Pairs (73 couples)

Ice dance (99 couples)

World standings for synchronized skating 

Senior Synchronized (38 Teams)

Junior Synchronized (42 Teams)

See also 
 ISU World Standings and Season's World Ranking
 List of highest ranked figure skaters by nation
 List of ISU World Standings and Season's World Ranking statistics
 2011–12 figure skating season
 2011–12 synchronized skating season

References

External links 
 International Skating Union
 ISU World standings for Single & Pair Skating and Ice Dance / ISU Season's World Ranking
 ISU World standings for Synchronized Skating

ISU World Standings and Season's World Ranking
Standings and Ranking
Standings and Ranking